Jabłoń  is a village in Parczew County, Lublin Voivodeship, in eastern Poland. It is the seat of the gmina (administrative district) called Gmina Jabłoń.

The village has a population of 1,251.

References

Villages in Parczew County
Siedlce Governorate
Kholm Governorate
Lublin Voivodeship (1919–1939)